Sharq va Gharb-e Shirgah Rural District is a rural district (dehestan) in North Savadkuh County, Mazandaran Province, Iran. At the 2006 census, its population was 10,396, in 2,826 families. The rural district has 25 villages.

References 

Rural Districts of Mazandaran Province
Savadkuh County